Daeheung station is a subway station on Seoul Subway Line 6 in Seoul, South Korea.

Station layout

Vicinity
Exit 1 : Sogang University
Exit 2 : Yonggang Elementary School, Sungmun Middle & High Schools
Exit 3 : Taeyeong APT
Exit 4 : Sinseok Elementary School

References 

Railway stations opened in 2000
Metro stations in Mapo District